Wish in One Hand... is a 1997 EP from Guided by Voices, recorded with a one-off cast, while leader Robert Pollard was between band line-ups.  "Teenage FBI" would later be re-recorded, and become the first single from Do the Collapse.

Track listing
All songs written by Robert Pollard.

Side A
 "Teenage FBI" [original version] – 1:39
 "Now I'm Crying" – 1:55

Side B
 "Real" – 2:25

1997 EPs
Guided by Voices EPs